Nurdağı is a town of Gaziantep Province of Turkey. Nurdağı is 45 km west of the city of Gaziantep. The population was 40,793 as of 2020.

A magnitude 7.8 earthquake struck four miles (6 km) from Nurdağı on 6 February 2023. Mass graves were created to bury the overwhelming number of dead in the area.

References

Populated places in Gaziantep Province